Bishop John Robinson  may refer to:
John Robinson (bishop of Woolwich) (1919–1983), British Bishop of Woolwich; Dean of Trinity College
John Edward Robinson (bishop), Missionary Bishop of the Methodist Episcopal Church
John Wesley Robinson, Missionary Bishop and Bishop of the Methodist Episcopal Church
John Robinson (bishop of London), English diplomat; later Bishop of Bristol from 1710 and Lord Privy Seal from 1711 to 1713

See also
John Robinson (disambiguation)